Dehnow-e Jari (also Romanized as Dehnow-e Jarī; also known as Dehno) is a village in Kuhestan Rural District, Jazmurian District, Rudbar-e Jonubi County, Kerman Province, Iran. As of the 2006 census, its population was 24, made up of 5 families.

References 

Populated places in Rudbar-e Jonubi County